was a Japanese idol girl group formed by Up-Front Promotion in 1999 and associated with Hello! Project. It was promoted as the "girls from Hawaii". After nine years, the group officially disbanded when Ayaka Kimura graduated from Hello! Project.

Members 
 1998–2008 – 
 1998–2004 – Mika Todd 
 1998–2001 – Danielle DeLaunay
 1998–2000 – Chelsea Ching
 1998–2000 – April Barbaran
 2000–2002 – Lehua Sandbo

History 
While in Hawaii, Tsunku's fellow band-mate from Sharam Q, Makoto, discovered the five girls who were to become Coconuts Musume. He had requested that Tsunku pick up the act, and in 1999, Coconuts Musume debuted on a Japanese television program, Asayan.

The group originally consisted of Ayaka Kimura, Mika Todd, Chelsea Ching, Danielle DeLaunay, and April Barbaran, with Chelsea taking lead vocals. After two singles, Chelsea and April left the group due to the difficulties of adjusting to life as a J-pop idol (neither spoke any Japanese when the group was formed) and to pursue other careers, such as modeling.

Lehua Sandbo was then recruited as a member, and the group made two more singles until DeLaunay, who also had difficulties adjusting, left to pursue a career in theater. After DeLaunay left, the group switched from the Sony Music Entertainment Japan label to the Zetima label. Between "Watashi mo 'I Love You'" of Sony Music Entertainment in Japan and "Jōnetsu Yuki Miraisen" of Zetima, sales increased by almost a quarter according to Oricon charts.

After one more single, Sandbo, too, retired from the group, went on to the American pageant circuit, and eventually married and gave birth to a daughter. The remaining duo, Todd and Kimura, never released anything else under the Coconuts Musume name, though they contributed to Hello! Project compilations, performed songs (including English covers) during Hello! Project concerts, and became Japanese spokespersons for Dole pineapples. They also appeared on and hosted various radio and television shows separately.

Todd became famous as a member of Minimoni, but retired in 2004 to study singing in California. Meanwhile, Kimura was part of Romans and Petitmoni's third generation. At this time, Kimura was the only member left in Coconuts Musume; however, she was still referred to within Hello! Project as "Coconuts Musume Ayaka".

On April 30, 2008, it was announced on Hello! Project's official website that Kimura was retiring to pursue a career in acting, thus disbanding Coconuts Musume.

Discography

Singles

Videos

Appearances

Television 
 Bishōjo Kyōiku (Ayaka's Surprise English Lesson)
 Bishōjo Kyōiku II (Ayaka's Surprise English Lesson)

Musicals 
 Love Century -Yume wa Minna Kerya Hajimaranai-
 Ken & Merī no Meken Kon On-stage
 Sayonara no Love Song
 Fushigi Shōjo Tantei Kyara & Mel

Radio 
 Kiss the Coconuts (Mika and Ayaka)
 Blend Kiss (Ayaka with Country Musume)

Books 
 2002-05-01 – 
 2002-08-05 –

References

External links 
 Official Hello! Project profile
 Coconuts Musume discography on the Up-Front Works official website
 Coconuts Musume discography on Tsunku.net

 

Japanese girl groups
Japanese idol groups
Japanese pop music groups
Hello! Project groups
Musical groups from Tokyo
Musical groups from Hawaii
Japanese electropop groups